Fernando Margáin Berlanga (born 1952) is a Mexican politician from the State of Nuevo León affiliated with the National Action Party (PAN) who has served in the upper house of the Mexican Congress.

Margáin served as municipal president (mayor) of San Pedro  from 1994 to 1997. Later, from 1997 to 1999, he served in the cabinet of Governor Fernando Canales.

In 2000 he was elected to serve in the Senate of Mexico.

He was municipal president (mayor) of San Pedro Garza García again from 2006 to 2009.

Son of Ricardo Margain Zozaya who was one of the main politicians in Nuevo León State in the 1960s and 1970s. Fernando Margáin is married to Alejandra Sada de Margáin.

In March 2015, he announced his intention of running for municipal president (mayor) of San Pedro Garza García again, this time as a candidate for the Humanist Party.

See also 
 1994 Nuevo León state election
 2006 Nuevo León state election

References

Living people
1952 births
Politicians from Monterrey
National Action Party (Mexico) politicians
Municipal presidents in Nuevo León
Members of the Senate of the Republic (Mexico)
21st-century Mexican politicians
University of Monterrey alumni
20th-century Mexican politicians